Pope Sixtus IV (r. 1471–1484) created 34 new cardinals in eight consistories:

Consistory of 16 December 1471 

The new cardinals received their titular churches on 22 December 1471.

Pietro Riario, O.F.M.Conv., nephew of the Pope, bishop of Treviso – cardinal-priest of S. Sisto, † 5 January 1474
Giuliano della Rovere, nephew of the Pope, bishop of Carpentras – cardinal-priest of S. Pietro in Vincoli, then cardinal-bishop of Sabina (19 April 1479), cardinal-bishop of Ostia e Velletri (31 January 1483), became Pope Julius II on 1 November 1503, † 21 February 1513

Consistory of 7 May 1473 

The new cardinals received their titular churches on 17 May 1473.

Philippe de Levis, archbishop of Arles – cardinal-priest of SS. Marcellino e Pietro, † 4 November 1475
Stefano Nardini, Archbishop of Milan – cardinal-priest of S. Adriano, then cardinal-priest of S. Maria in Trastevere (1476), † 22 October 1484
Ausiàs Despuig, archbishop of Monreale, governor of Rome, vice-camerlengo of the Holy Roman Church, ambassador of the Kingdom of Aragon – cardinal-priest of S. Vitale, then cardinal-priest of S. Sabina (12 December 1477), † 3 September 1483
Pedro González de Mendoza, bishop of Sigüenza, chancellor of the Kingdom of Castile – cardinal-priest of S. Maria in Domnica, then cardinal-priest of S. Croce in Gerusalemme (6 July 1478), † 11 January 1495
Giacopo Antonio Venier, bishop of Cuenca – cardinal-priest of SS. Vito e Modesto, then cardinal-priest of S. Clemente (3 December 1476), † 3 August 1479
Giovanni Battista Cibo, bishop of Molfetta and datary of His Holiness – cardinal-priest of S. Balbina, then cardinal-priest of S. Cecilia (January 1474), became Pope Innocent VIII on 29 August 1484, † 25 July 1492
Giovanni Arcimboldi, bishop of Novara, ambassador of the Duchy of Milan – cardinal-priest of SS. Nereo ed Achilleo, then cardinal-priest of S. Prasede (30 December 1476), † 2 October 1488
Philibert Hugonet, bishop of Mâcon – cardinal-priest of S. Lucia in Silice, then cardinal-priest of SS. Giovanni e Paolo (17 August 1477), † 11 September 1484

Consistory of 18 December 1476 

Jorge da Costa, archbishop of Lisbon, first minister of the Kingdom of Portugal – cardinal-priest of SS.Marcellino e Pietro (received the title on 15 January 1477), then cardinal-priest of S. Maria in Trastevere (1485), cardinal-bishop of Albano (10 October 1491), cardinal-bishop of Tusculum (14 May 1501), cardinal-bishop of Porto e Santa Rufina (10 April 1503), † 18 September 1508
Charles de Bourbon, archbishop of Lyon – cardinal-priest of SS. Silvestro e Martino (received the title on 15 January 1477), † 17 September 1488
Pedro Ferris, bishop of Tarazona – cardinal-priest of S. Sisto (received the title on 30 December 1476), † 25 September 1478
Giovanni Battista Mellini, bishop of Urbino – cardinal-priest of SS. Nereo ed Achilleo (received the title on 30 December 1476), † 24 July 1478
Pierre de Foix, bishop of Vannes and Aire – cardinal-deacon of SS. Cosma e Damiano (received the title on 15 January 1477), † 10 August 1490

Consistory of 10 December 1477 

The new cardinals received their titular churches on 12 December 1477.
Cristoforo della Rovere, relative of the Pope, archbishop of Tarentaise and governor of the Castle S. Angelo – cardinal-priest of S. Vitale, † 1 February 1478
Girolamo Basso della Rovere, nephew of the Pope, bishop of Recanati – cardinal-priest of S. Balbina, then cardinal-priest of S. Crisogono (17 September 1479), cardinal-bishop of Palestrina (31 August 1492), cardinal-bishop of Sabina (29 November 1503), † 1 September 1507
Georg Hesler, protonotary apostolic, chancellor of the Frederick III, Holy Roman Emperor – cardinal-priest of S. Lucia in Silice, † 21 September 1482
Gabriele Rangone, O.F.M. Obs., bishop of Eger – cardinal-priest of SS. Sergio e Bacco, † 27 September 1486
Pietro Foscari, protonotary apostolic – cardinal-priest of S. Nicola inter Immagines, † 11 August 1485
Giovanni d'Aragona, son of the king Ferrante I of Naples, administrator of the see of Taranto, bishop of Cava – cardinal-deacon of S. Adriano, then cardinal-priest of S. Adriano (14 January 1480), cardinal-priest of S. Sabina (10 September 1483), † 17 October 1485
Raffaele Riario, grand-nephew of the Pope, protonotary apostolic – cardinal-deacon of S. Giorgio in Velabro, then cardinal-bishop of Albano (29 November 1503), cardinal-bishop of Sabina (3 August 1507), cardinal-bishop of Porto e Santa Rufina (22 September 1508) i cardinal-bishop of Ostia e Velletri (20 January 1511), † 9 July 1521

Consistory of 10 February 1478 
Domenico della Rovere, relative of the Pope, governor of the Castle S. Angelo– cardinal-priest of S. Vitale, then cardinal-priest of S. Clemente (13 August 1479), † 22 April 1501

Consistory of 15 May 1480 
Paolo di Campofregoso, archbishop of Genoa – cardinal-priest of S. Anastasia, then cardinal-priest of S. Sisto (9 March 1489), † 22 March 1498
Cosma Orsini, O.S.B., archbishop of Trani – cardinal-priest of S. Sisto, then cardinal-priest of SS. Nereo ed Achilleo (3 June 1480), † 21 November 1481
Ferry de Clugny, bishop of Tournai – cardinal-priest of S. Vitale, then cardinal-priest of S. Maria in Domnica (1482), † 7 October 1483
Giovanni Battista Savelli, protonotary apostolic – cardinal-deacon of SS. Vito e Modesto, then cardinal-deacon of S. Nicola in Carcere (1483), † 18 September 1498
Giovanni Colonna, protonotary apostolic – cardinal-deacon of S. Maria in Aquiro, † 26 September 1508

Consistory of 15 November 1483 

Giovanni Conti, archbishop of Conza – cardinal-priest of SS. Nereo ed Achilleo, then cardinal-priest of S. Vitale (1484), † 20 October 1493
Hélie de Bourdeilles, O.F.M.Obs., archbishop of Tours, confessor of the king Louis XI of France – cardinal-priest of S. Lucia in Silice, † 5 July 1484
Juan Margarit i Pau, bishop of Girona, chancellor of the Kingdom of Aragon – cardinal-priest of S. Vitale, then cardinal-priest of S. Balbina (1484), † 21 November 1484
Giovanni Giacomo Sclafenati, bishop of Parma, secretary of the Sacred College of Cardinals, prefect of the Castle S. Angelo – cardinal-priest of S. Stefano al Monte Celio, † 9 December 1497
Giambattista Orsini, protonotary apostolic – cardinal-deacon of S. Maria in Domnica, then cardinal-deacon of S. Maria Nuova (23 March 1489), cardinal-priest of SS. Giovanni e Paolo (27 February 1493), † 22 February 1503

Consistory of 17 March 1484 
Ascanio Sforza, administrator of the see of Pavia – cardinal-deacon of SS. Vito e Modesto, † 27 May 1505

References

External links 

Sixtus IV
15th-century Catholicism
Pope Sixtus IV
College of Cardinals